Lezhnev is a Russian masculine surname, its feminine counterpart is Lezhneva. It may refer to
Mikhail Lezhnev, Esq., CPA (Mike Lezhnev) (born 1988 in Russia), a New York tax/corporate Attorney and CPA
Kseniya Lezhnev, Esq. (born in Russia), is a New York litigation Attorney
Julia Lezhneva (born 1989), Russian soprano opera singer and recitalist
Olga Lezhneva (born 1983), Ukrainian film, and television actress
Mihailo Lezhnev, a character in the novel Rudin by Ivan Turgenev

References

Russian-language surnames